The year 2010 is the 10th year in the history of World Extreme Cagefighting, a mixed martial arts promotion based in the United States. In 2010 WEC held 8 events beginning with, WEC 46: Varner vs. Henderson.

Title fights

Events list

WEC 46: Varner vs. Henderson

WEC 46: Varner vs. Henderson was an event held on January 10, 2009 at the ARCO Arena in Sacramento, California.

Results

WEC 47: Bowles vs. Cruz

WEC 47: Bowles vs. Cruz was an event held on March 6, 2010 at the Nationwide Arena in Columbus, Ohio.

Results

WEC 48: Aldo vs. Faber

WEC 48: Aldo vs. Faber was an event held on April 24, 2010 at the ARCO Arena in Sacramento, California.

Results

WEC 49: Varner vs. Shalorus

WEC 49: Varner vs. Shalorus was an event held on June 20, 2010 at Rexall Place in Edmonton, Alberta, Canada.

Results

WEC 50: Cruz vs. Benavidez 2

WEC 50: Cruz vs. Benavidez 2 was an event held on August 18, 2010 at the Pearl at The Palms in Las Vegas, Nevada.

Results

WEC 51: Aldo vs. Gamburyan

WEC 51: Aldo vs. Gamburyan was an event held on September 30, 2010 at the 1stBank Center in Broomfield, Colorado.

Results

WEC 52: Faber vs. Mizugaki

WEC 52: Faber vs. Mizugaki was an event held on November 11, 2010 at the Pearl at The Palms in Las Vegas, Nevada.

Results

WEC 53: Henderson vs. Pettis

WEC 53: Henderson vs. Pettis was an event held on December 16, 2010 at the Jobing.com Arena in Glendale, Arizona.

Results

See also 
 World Extreme Cagefighting
 List of World Extreme Cagefighting champions
 List of WEC events

References

World Extreme Cagefighting events
2010 in mixed martial arts